Aerospace force or air and space force may refer to:

 Aerospace Force of the Islamic Revolutionary Guard Corps (NEHSA)
 French Air and Space Force (AAE)
 Israeli Air and Space Arm
 Russian Aerospace Forces (VKS)
 Spanish Air and Space Force

See also
 Space force
 Space Force (disambiguation)
 Air Force (disambiguation)
 Air force
 Force (disambiguation)